Cary-Hiroyuki Tagawa (Japanese: 田川 洋行, Tagawa Hiroyuki; born September 27, 1950) is a Japanese-American actor, film producer, and martial artist.

Often cast as villains, he is known for his film roles in The Last Emperor (1987), the James Bond film Licence to Kill (1989), Showdown in Little Tokyo (1991), American Me (1992), Rising Sun (1993), The Phantom (1996), Snow Falling on Cedars (1999), Pearl Harbor (2001), Planet of the Apes (also 2001), Memoirs of a Geisha (2005), Tekken (2009), 47 Ronin (2013), Tekken 2: Kazuya's Revenge (2014), and Kubo and the Two Strings (2017). He starred as Trade Minister Nobusuke Tagomi on the Amazon Prime television series The Man in the High Castle (2015–2018) and Hiroki Watanabe on the Netflix series Lost in Space (2018–2021).

Tagawa is known for his role as the evil sorcerer Shang Tsung in various works of the Mortal Kombat franchise: he first played the character in the 1995 film adaptation, and reprised it in 2013 for the television series Mortal Kombat: Legacy and in 2019 for the video game Mortal Kombat 11.

Early life
Tagawa was born in Tokyo, Japan, the son of Japanese Takarazuka actress Mariko Hata and a Japanese-American father who served in the United States Army and was stationed at Fort Bragg, North Carolina; Fort Polk, Louisiana; and Fort Hood, Texas. His mother tongues are English and Japanese but he also speaks some Korean and Spanish. 

Tagawa was raised in various cities. His family finally settled in Southern California, where he began acting in high school while attending Duarte High School. He attended the University of Southern California and was an exchange student in Japan. He studied kendo and Shotokan karate under Masatoshi Nakayama at the Japan Karate Association.

Career

His breakthrough as an actor came when he was cast as the Eunuch Chang in The Last Emperor (1987). In 1989, he played an undercover agent of the Hong Kong Narcotics Board in the James Bond film Licence to Kill. In 1991, he starred alongside Dolph Lundgren and Brandon Lee in the action film Showdown in Little Tokyo, where he played the role of Yakuza boss Yoshida. He also starred alongside James Hong and Jeff Speakman in the same year in the film The Perfect Weapon, where he played Kai, an assistant to the Korean mafia families.

In 1993, he starred as the wayward scion of a Japanese industrialist in Rising Sun, where Sean Connery, Wesley Snipes, and Harvey Keitel played detectives holding various viewpoints about the murder of a young woman that Tagawa's character was being framed for.

He appeared in the film Mortal Kombat (1995) as the sorcerer Shang Tsung; he reprised the role in the web series Mortal Kombat: Legacy in 2013, and in the video game Mortal Kombat 11 in 2019. He also appeared as the deadly pirate leader Kabai Sengh in The Phantom (1996). Tagawa is among the actors, producers and directors interviewed in the documentary The Slanted Screen (2006), directed by Jeff Adachi, about the representation of Asian and Asian-American men in Hollywood.

Tagawa played Heihachi Mishima in Tekken, the film adaptation of the video game franchise. In 2006, he provided the voice of Brushogun in Teen Titans: Trouble in Tokyo. He was in the film Johnny Tsunami (1999) and its sequel Johnny Kapahala: Back on Board (2007). In between those two films, Tagawa played Attar's mentor Krull in Tim Burton's version of Planet of the Apes (2001).

He played Satoshi Takeda in Revenge, a powerful CEO in Japan and Emily Thorne's former mentor in her quest for revenge. In season 2, Tagawa took over the role from Hiroyuki Sanada, who was unable to continue due to scheduling conflicts.

Tagawa also plays the role of Shogun Tokugawa Tsunayoshi in the 2013 film 47 Ronin.

In 2015, Tagawa was cast as one of the lead characters, Nobusuke Tagomi, the Trade Minister of the Pacific States of America in Amazon's The Man in the High Castle based on Philip K. Dick's novel of the same name. Also in November 2015, both he and Taimak (The Last Dragon) were honorees for the Fists of Legends Legacy Award at the Urban Action Showcase & Expo.

In 2013, Tagawa started working with Russian film actors Pyotr Mamonov and Ivan Okhlobystin.

Personal life
In 2015, Tagawa converted to Eastern Orthodoxy, and in 2016, he acquired Russian citizenship.

Filmography

Film

Short films

Television

Web

Video games

Bibliography

References

External links

 

1950 births
American emigrants to Russia
American male actors of Japanese descent
American male film actors
American male karateka
American male television actors
American male video game actors
American male voice actors
American film actors of Asian descent
Converts to Eastern Orthodoxy
Eastern Orthodox Christians from Japan
Japanese emigrants to the United States
Japanese emigrants to Russia
Japanese male film actors
Japanese male karateka
Japanese male television actors
Japanese male video game actors
Japanese male voice actors
Living people
Male actors from Tokyo
Russian Orthodox Christians from the United States
Russian people of American descent
Russian people of Japanese descent
University of Southern California alumni
People with acquired Russian citizenship
Naturalised citizens of Russia